Yershovsky District is an administrative and municipal district (raion), one of the thirty-eight in Saratov Oblast, Russia. It is located in the eastern central part of the oblast. Its administrative center is the town of Yershov. Population: 41,609 (2010 Census);  The population of Yershov accounts for 51.5% of the district's total population.

References

Notes

Sources

Districts of Saratov Oblast